Asín is a surname originating from Aragon, Spain.
The Asín lineage of infanzones derives from the village of Asín de Broto, attested from the reigns of Pedro II and Jaime I (13th century), members of lower nobility from the reign of Pedro IV (14th century).

People with the name Asín:
Miguel Asín Palacios
Fernando de Andrés Asín
Alfredo Quíspez Asín

References

External links
armoria.info
redaragon.com

Spanish-language surnames